Ayrton Senna da Silva (21 March 1960 – 1 May 1994) was a Brazilian racing driver who won the Formula One World Drivers' Championship in , , and . Senna is one of three Formula One drivers from Brazil to win the World Championship and won 41 Grands Prix and 65 pole positions, with the latter being the record until 2006. He died in an accident while leading the 1994 San Marino Grand Prix, driving for the Williams team.

Senna began his motorsport career in karting, moved up to open-wheel racing in 1981 and won the 1983 British Formula Three Championship. He made his Formula One debut with Toleman-Hart in 1984, before moving to Lotus-Renault the following year and winning six Grands Prix over the next three seasons. In 1988, he joined Frenchman Alain Prost at McLaren-Honda. Between them, they won all but one of the 16 Grands Prix that year, and Senna claimed his first World Championship. Prost claimed the championship in 1989, and Senna his second and third championships in 1990 and 1991. In 1992, the Williams-Renault combination began to dominate Formula One. Senna nonetheless managed to finish the 1993 season as runner-up, winning five races and negotiating a move to Williams in 1994.

Senna was recognised for his qualifying speed over one lap, and from 1989 until 2006 he held the record for most pole positions. He was also acclaimed for his wet weather performances, such as the 1984 Monaco Grand Prix, the 1985 Portuguese Grand Prix, and the 1993 European Grand Prix. He holds a record six victories at the Monaco Grand Prix, is the fifth-most successful driver of all time in terms of race wins and has won more races for McLaren than any other driver. Senna courted controversy throughout his career, particularly during his turbulent rivalry with Prost. In the Japanese Grands Prix of 1989 and 1990, each of which decided the championship of that year, collisions between Senna and Prost determined the eventual winner.

Early life and career

Senna was born at 2:35 AM (05:35 GMT) on Monday, 21 March 1960, in the Pro-Matre Maternity Hospital of Santana, a neighbourhood of São Paulo. The middle child of a wealthy Brazilian family, he was born to landowner and factory owner Milton Guirado da Silva and his wife Neide Senna da Silva; he had an older sister, Viviane, and a younger brother, Leonardo. He was left-handed. Senna's mother was the granddaughter of Italian immigrants, while his father was born to a Spanish mother (from Tíjola, Province of Almería) and a Brazilian father from São Paulo.

The house where Senna spent the first four years of his life belonged to Neide's father, João Senna. It was located on the corner of Avenida Aviador Guilherme with Avenida Gil Santos Dumont, less than 100 meters from Campo de Marte, a large area where they operated the Aeronautics Material park and an airport. Senna was highly athletic, excelling in gymnastics and other sports, and developed an interest in cars and motor racing at the age of four. However, as a small boy, he had poor motor coordination and had trouble climbing stairways by the age of three. An electroencephalogram (EEG) was unremarkable (i.e. showed no abnormalities). Senna's parents nicknamed him "Beco". At the age of seven, Senna first learned to drive a Jeep around his family's farm and also how to change gears without using a clutch.

Senna attended Colegio Rio Branco in the São Paulo neighbourhood of Higienópolis and graduated in 1977 with a grade 5 in physics along with other grades in mathematics, chemistry, and English. He later enrolled in a college that specialised in business administration, but dropped out after three months. Overall, his grades amounted up to 68%.

Senna's first kart was built by his father using a small 1-HP lawnmower engine. Senna started racing at Interlagos and entered a karting competition at the age of 13. He started his first race on pole position, facing rivals who were some years older than him; despite this, he managed to lead most of the race before retiring after colliding with a rival. His father supported his son and Lucio Pascal Gascon soon managed the developing talent.

Senna went on to win the South American Kart Championship in 1977. He contested the Karting World Championship each year from 1978 to 1982, finishing runner-up in 1979 and 1980. In 1978, he was the teammate of Terry Fullerton, from whom Senna later felt was the rival he got the most satisfaction racing against also because of the lack of money and politics at that level.

In 1981, Senna moved to Eaton near Norwich in England to begin single-seater racing, winning the RAC and Townsend Thoresen Formula Ford 1600 Championships that year with the Van Diemen team.

Despite this, Senna initially did not believe he would continue in motorsport. At the end of that season, under pressure from his parents to take up a role in the family business, Senna announced his retirement from Formula Ford and returned to Brazil. Before leaving England, however, Senna was offered a drive with a Formula Ford 2000 team for £10,000. Back in Brazil, he decided to take this offer and returned to live in England. As da Silva is the most common Brazilian surname, he adopted his mother's maiden name, Senna. Senna went on to win the 1982 British and European Formula Ford 2000 championships. For that season, Senna arrived with sponsorship from Banerj and Pool.

In 1983, Senna drove in the British Formula Three Championship for the West Surrey Racing team. He dominated the first half of the season until Martin Brundle, driving a similar car for Eddie Jordan Racing, closed the gap in the second part of the championship. Senna won the title at the final round after a closely fought and, at times, acrimonious battle with the Briton. In November that year, Senna also triumphed at the inaugural Macau Formula 3 Grand Prix with Teddy Yip's Toyota-powered Theodore Racing Team.

Senna was managed for most of his career by Armando Teixeira, who was assisted by Domingo Piedade.

Formula One career

Toleman (1984)

In 1983, Senna tested for Formula One teams Williams, McLaren, Brabham, and Toleman. Peter Warr of Lotus, Ron Dennis of McLaren, and Bernie Ecclestone of Brabham made offers for testing in 1984 and presented long-term contracts that tied Senna to driving later on. During his test for Williams at the 3.149-km (1.957-mi) Donington Park circuit, Senna completed 40 laps and was quicker than the other drivers, including Williams's reigning World Champion Keke Rosberg. Neither Williams or McLaren had a vacancy for the 1984 season. Both Williams boss Frank Williams and McLaren boss Ron Dennis noted that Senna insisted that he got to run their cars before anyone else (other than their regular drivers such as Rosberg) so that he would have the best chance of a good showing by having a fresh car.

Peter Warr actually wanted to replace Nigel Mansell with Senna at Lotus, but their British-based title sponsor, Imperial Tobacco (John Player & Sons), wanted a British driver. Senna, however, was determined to drive that season and certainly on his own terms. Senna's test for Brabham occurred at Circuit Paul Ricard in November 1983. Senna impressed the Brabham team and was linked to their second seat. However, the team's main sponsor, Italian dairy company Parmalat, wanted an Italian driver. Brabham's second car was eventually shared by brothers Teo and Corrado Fabi, while Piquet convinced Ecclestone to sign his friend Roberto Moreno as the test driver.
Consequently, Senna joined Toleman, a relatively new team, using less competitive Pirelli tyres. Venezuelan Johnny Cecotto, a former Grand Prix motorcycle racing world champion, was his teammate.
In 1984, Senna hired Nuno Cobra to assess his physical condition due to his concern over his low weight.

Senna made his debut at the Brazilian Grand Prix in Rio de Janeiro, where he qualified 17th, but retired when the Hart 415T turbocharger failed on lap 8. He scored his first World Championship point when he finished 6th in his second race at the South African Grand Prix at Kyalami with severe cramp in his neck and shoulders, and replicated that result two weeks later at the Belgian Grand Prix.

A combination of tyre issues and a fuel-pressure problem resulted in his failure to qualify for the San Marino Grand Prix, the only time this happened during his career. Toleman decided not to run both cars during Friday qualifying at Imola due to a dispute with tyre supplier Pirelli (Toleman were in the process of switching from Pirelli to Michelin). Senna then suffered a fuel-pressure problem in the wet Saturday session at Tosa (the furthest point on the circuit from the pits) and did not have enough time for it to be fixed to allow him to make the grid. Senna's best result of the season came at the Monaco Grand Prix, the first wet-weather race of the season. Qualifying 13th on the grid, he made steady progress in climbing through the field, passing Niki Lauda for second on lap 19. He quickly began to cut the gap to race leader Alain Prost, but before he could attack Prost, the race was stopped on lap 31 for safety reasons, as the rain had grown even heavier. At the time the race was stopped, Senna was catching Prost by about 4 seconds per lap (while the Tyrrell-Ford of Stefan Bellof was catching both at the same rate, although he was later disqualified due to weight restrictions broken by Tyrrell).

Senna was renowned throughout his career for his capacity to provide very specific technical details about the performance of his cars and track conditions long before the advent of telemetry; this skill led Senna's first F1 race engineer, Pat Symonds, to regard the Dallas Grand Prix in the United States as the initial highlight of Senna's debut season, instead of Monaco. Symonds recalled in an interview:The car was reasonably competitive there, so we expected to have a good race, but Ayrton spun early in the race. He then found his way back through the field in a quite effective way and we were looking for a pretty good finish, but then he hit the wall, damaged the rear wheel and the driveshaft and retired, which was a real shame. The real significance of that was that when he came back to the pits he told me what happened and said "I'm sure that the wall moved!" And even though I've heard every excuse every driver has ever made, I certainly hadn't heard of that one! But Ayrton being Ayrton, with his incredible belief in himself, the absolute conviction, he then talked me into going with him after the race to have a look at the place where he had crashed. And he was absolutely right, which was the amazing thing! Dallas being a street circuit, the track was surrounded by concrete blocks and what had happened – we could see it from the tyre marks – was that someone had hit at the far end of the concrete block and that made it swivel slightly, so that the leading edge of the block was standing out by a few millimetres. And he was driving with such precision that those few millimetres were the difference between hitting the wall and not hitting the wall. While I had been, at first, annoyed that we had retired from the race through a driver error, when I saw what had happened, when I saw how he had been driving, that increased my respect for the guy by quite a lot.

 
That season, Senna took two more podium finishes—third at the British and Portuguese Grands Prix—and placed 9th in the Drivers' Championship with 13 points overall. He did not take part in the Italian Grand Prix after he was suspended by Toleman for being in breach of his contract by entering talks with Lotus for 1985 without informing the Toleman team first. Although Senna did have a £100,000 buyout clause in his contract, the team had to be informed before discussions with another team started. Senna became the first driver Lotus had signed not personally chosen by team founder Colin Chapman, who had died in 1982.

At the end of the year, Senna had developed Bell's palsy, possibly from a virus. One side of his face had become completely paralysed; Sid Watkins gave Senna steroids to preserve the possibility of recovery.

Lotus (1985–1987)
1985

Senna was partnered in his first year at Lotus-Renault by Italian driver Elio de Angelis. He had dominated testing times at Rio, although he retired with electrical issues during the race weekend. Although the Renault-powered Lotus 97T was quick and nimble, particularly on tight and bumpy circuits and perhaps had the best suspension of any car that year, the car was unreliable and Senna made a few mistakes out of inexperience. At the second round of the season, the Portuguese Grand Prix, Senna took the first pole position of his Formula 1 career. He converted it into his first victory in the race, which was held in very wet conditions, winning by over a minute from Michele Alboreto in the Ferrari and lapping everyone up to and including 3rd placed Patrick Tambay. The race was the first 'Grand Slam' of Senna's career, as he also set the fastest lap of the race. He would later argue it was the best drive of his career, an opinion shared by race engineer Steve Hallam, who recognised Senna's "truly special" talent.

Senna led at the San Marino, Monaco, British and German Grands Prix but retired from all these races either from engine failure or running out of fuel, and he had a huge accident at the French Grand Prix at the Circuit Paul Ricard's fastest corner after an engine failure in the middle of the corner. He did not finish in the points again until coming second at the Austrian Grand Prix, despite taking pole three more times in the intervening period. (His determination to take pole at the Monaco Grand Prix had infuriated Alboreto and Niki Lauda; Senna had set a fast time early and was accused of deliberately baulking the other drivers by running more laps than necessary, a charge he rejected, though the accusations continued in Canada when drivers accused him of running on the racing line when on his slow down lap forcing others on qualifiers to move off line and lose time). Two more podiums followed in the Netherlands and Italy, before Senna added his second victory in wet-dry conditions, at the Circuit de Spa-Francorchamps in Belgium. Senna's relationship with De Angelis soured over the season, as both drivers demanded top driver status within Lotus and, after spending six years at the team, De Angelis departed for Brabham at the end of the year, convinced that Lotus were becoming focused around the Brazilian driver. Senna and De Angelis finished the season 4th and 5th respectively in the driver rankings, separated by five points. In terms of qualifying, however, Senna had begun to establish himself as the quickest in the field: his tally of seven poles that season was far more than that of any of the other drivers (Renault's V6 qualifying engines were reported to be producing over ).

1986

De Angelis was replaced at Lotus by Scotland's Johnny Dumfries after Senna vetoed Derek Warwick from joining the team, saying that Lotus could not run competitive cars for two top drivers at the same time. Senna allegedly pushed for his former flatmate and fellow Brazilian Maurício Gugelmin to join the team as a pure number two driver, but the team's major sponsor John Player & Sons (JPS) insisted on a British driver, which led to the signing of Dumfries. Senna later admitted "It was bad, bad. Until then I had a good relationship with Derek." Senna started the season well, coming second in Brazil behind the Williams-Honda of fellow countryman Nelson Piquet, and winning the Spanish Grand Prix by just 0.014s from Piquet's teammate Nigel Mansell in one of the closest finishes in Formula One history to find himself leading the World Championship after two races. Although the 98T was like the 97T which came before it, a quick car with superiority on tight, bumpy circuits but plagued with poor reliability, particularly in the second half of the season it saw him drift behind the Williams pairing of Mansell and Piquet as well as defending and eventual champion, Alain Prost. Nonetheless, Senna was once more the top qualifier with eight poles, with a further six podium finishes included another win at the Detroit Grand Prix, thus finishing the season fourth in the driver's standings again, with a total of 55 points.

After winning the Detroit Grand Prix from Frenchmen Prost and Jacques Laffite – which took place one day after Brazil was eliminated from the 1986 FIFA World Cup by France - Senna asked a trackside supporter for the Brazilian flag and he drove one lap waving it. Thereafter, he repeated this ritual every time he won a race. During an interview on American television, he used English curse words to express his frustration of having to go into the pits earlier than expected due to a deflating rear tire. Senna also had a brief foray into rallying where he tried out a Vauxhall Nova, a MG Metro 6R4, a Ford Sierra RS Cosworth and a Ford Escort on a stretch of land closed to the public.

1987

Team Lotus had a new engine deal in 1987, running the same turbocharged Honda V6 engines as Williams had used to win the previous year's Constructors' Championship, and with them came a new teammate, 34-year-old Japanese driver, Satoru Nakajima, who was a test driver employed directly by Honda. The team guaranteed Senna contractually preferential treatment over Nakajima in the allocation of equipment. Senna started the season with mixed fortunes: a podium at the San Marino Grand Prix was tempered by controversy at the following race at Spa-Francorchamps, where he collided with Mansell, and afterward in the pits an irate Mansell grabbed Senna by the throat and had to be restrained by Lotus mechanics. Senna then won two races in a row, which helped him take the lead in the World Championship: the ensuing Monaco Grand Prix (the first of his record six victories at the Principality) and the Detroit Grand Prix, his second victory in two years at the angular Michigan street circuit and the first ever for an active suspension F1 car. As the championship progressed, however, it became evident that the Williams cars had the advantage over the rest of the field, the gap between the Honda-engined teams made most obvious at the British Grand Prix, where Mansell and Piquet in the superior Williams cars lapped the Lotuses of Senna and Nakajima who finished 3rd and 4th respectively. Senna became dissatisfied with his chances at Lotus and at Monza it was announced that he would be joining McLaren for 1988. Senna finished the season strongly, coming second in the final two races in Japan and Australia, however post-race scrutineering at the final race found the brake ducts of his Lotus to be wider than permitted by the rules and he was disqualified, bringing his last and most successful season with Lotus to a sour end. Senna was classified third in the final standings, with 57 points, six podium finishes and only one pole position. This season marked a turning point in Senna's career as, throughout the year, he built a deep relationship with Honda, which paid big dividends, as McLaren had secured Williams's supply of Honda's V6 turbo engines for 1988.

McLaren (1988–1993)

1988

In 1988, due to the relationship he had built up with Honda throughout the 1987 season with Lotus, and with the approval of McLaren's number-one driver and then-double world champion, Alain Prost, Senna joined the McLaren team. The foundation for a fierce competition between Senna and Prost was laid, culminating in a number of dramatic race incidents between the two over the next five years. However, the experienced pair also quickly realized, despite their personal rivalry, they had to work together, especially in testing, to keep ahead of their main opposition from Ferrari, Williams, Benetton and Lotus.

One notable incident of the year was at the Monaco Grand Prix, where Senna out-qualified Prost by 1.4 seconds and led for most of the race before crashing on lap 67. Instead of returning to the pit lane, Senna was so distressed by his own mistake that he went back to his apartment and did not contact the team until he walked into the pit garage as they were packing up later that night. After team manager Jo Ramirez called him through his Monaco apartment's cleaner hours after he had crashed, Senna was still devastated by his own mistake. As the television cameras had not captured his crash, team boss Ron Dennis did not know what had caused his DNF until then, though Prost speculated that judging from the tyre marks, it appeared as though Senna had clipped the inside barrier at Portier, which pitched him into the outside guard rail. At the Portuguese Grand Prix, Prost made a slightly faster start than Senna, but the Brazilian, as he would a number of times- dived into the fast first corner ahead. Prost responded and went to pass Senna at the end of the first lap. Prost kept his foot down and soon edged Senna into the first corner and started pulling away. Prost, normally a calm individual was angered by Senna's manoeuvre, and the Brazilian got away with a warning from the FIA. At the post-race team debrief, Prost voiced his anger at the move which prompted Senna to apologize to Prost for the incident. Ultimately, the pair won 15 of 16 races in the dominant McLaren MP4/4 in 1988 with Senna coming out on top, winning his first Formula One world championship title by taking eight wins to Prost's seven. Prost scored more points over the season, but had to drop three-second places as only the 11 best scores counted, meaning that Senna bested Prost by 3 points.

However, the biggest incident of the year happened at the Italian Grand Prix at Monza. With two laps remaining, Senna held a five-second lead over the Ferraris of Gerhard Berger and Michele Alboreto, who were closing in on the McLaren (Prost had earlier retired with a badly misfiring engine). Going into the Rettifilo Chicane, Senna closed on the Williams of Jean-Louis Schlesser (standing in for the unwell Nigel Mansell). Schlesser steered wide, attempting to give Senna room to lap him, losing then regaining control to avoid going into the sand trap, and the two collided; Senna's car was beached on top of a curb and had stalled. Ferrari went on to finish 1–2, the first in an Italian Grand Prix since the death of the team's founder Enzo Ferrari. This proved to be the only race McLaren did not win in 1988.

During the season, Senna rewrote the record books. His eight wins beat the old record of seven jointly held by Jim Clark and Prost (1984). His 13 pole positions also beat the record of nine held by Nelson Piquet (1984).

1989

The following year, the rivalry between Senna and Prost intensified into numerous battles on the track and a psychological war off it. Some controversy also arose after the French GP press conference when Ron Dennis declared that they found consistent differences between the Honda engines from Prost and Senna in the detriment of Prost. Tension and mistrust between the two drivers increased when Senna overtook Prost at the restart of the San Marino Grand Prix, a move which Prost claimed violated a pre-race agreement (Senna denied the existence of any agreement, though Prost's story was backed up by John Hogan of the team's major sponsor, Marlboro). A discussion between the two drivers and Dennis during a test session at the Pembrey circuit in Wales effectively confirmed to Dennis and the team of Senna and Prost's personal animosity. Senna took an early lead in the championship with victories in San Marino, Monaco, and Mexico. Senna also managed to win in Germany, Belgium, and Spain. However, unreliability in four consecutive races in Phoenix, Canada, France and Britain, and further unreliability in Italy, together with collisions in Brazil and Portugal, swung the title in Prost's favour.

Prost took the 1989 world title after a collision with Senna at the Suzuka Circuit in Japan, the penultimate race of the season, which Senna needed to win to remain in contention for the title. Prost had managed to leave the grid faster than Senna by removing the gurney flap from his car, which was unbeknownst to Senna. This reduction in aerodynamic downforce made Prost's car faster on the straights, but slower through corners—a clever choice to make it even harder for Senna to pass on a circuit already difficult on which to pass. On lap 46, Senna had finally come next to Prost and attempted a pass on the inside at the tight last chicane. Prost turned right into the upcoming corner, cutting Senna off and tangling wheels with him. The collision caused both McLarens to slide to a standstill into the escape road ahead. Prost abandoned the race at that point, whereas Senna urged marshals for a push-start, which he received, then proceeding with the race after a pit stop to replace the damaged nose on his car. He took the lead from the Benetton of Alessandro Nannini and went on to claim victory, only to be disqualified following a stewards meeting after the race. Senna was disqualified for receiving a push start, cutting the chicane after the collision with Prost, and for crossing into the pit lane entry which was not part of the track. A large fine and temporary suspension of his FIA Super License followed in the winter of 1989, and an irate Senna engaged in public criticism with the FIA and its then-president, Jean-Marie Balestre, whom he blamed for his disqualification in Japan. Senna claimed that Balestre had forced the race stewards to disqualify him so his fellow Frenchman Prost could win the championship, though the stewards of the meeting denied that Balestre forced their decision, claiming that he was not present when the decision was made. Senna finished the season second with six wins and one second place. Prost, who could not stand working with Senna in what he felt was a hostile environment, left McLaren for rivals Ferrari for the following year. Prost had burned bridges even with Ron Dennis after a trophy-related incident in Italy.

1990

In 1990, Senna took a commanding lead in the championship with six wins, two second-places, and three thirds. With Prost gone to Ferrari, he also had a new teammate in Austrian driver and friend Gerhard Berger. Among his victories were the opening round on the wide streets of Phoenix, in which he diced for the lead for several laps with Jean Alesi's Tyrrell before coming out on top, and in Germany, where he fought Benetton driver Alessandro Nannini throughout the race for the win. Senna won six races, including another Monaco win, and as the season reached its final quarter, however, Alain Prost in his Ferrari rose to the challenge with five wins, including a crucial victory in Spain where he and teammate Nigel Mansell finished 1–2 for the Scuderia. Senna had gone out with a damaged radiator, and the gap between Senna and Prost was now reduced to 9 points with two races remaining.

At the penultimate round of the championship in Japan at Suzuka, where Senna and Prost collided the previous year, Senna took pole ahead of Prost. Before qualifying, Senna had sought assurances from the organisers to move pole position left onto the clean side of the racetrack, but after qualifying, FIA president Balestre denied Senna's request, leaving Senna to start on the dirty right side, thus favouring Prost on the left. In addition, as revealed by F1 journalist Maurice Hamilton, the FIA had warned that crossing the yellow line of the pit exit on the right to better position oneself at the first corner would have not been appropriate, further infuriating Senna. At the beginning of the race, Prost pulled ahead of Senna, who immediately tried to repass Prost at the first corner. While Prost turned in, Senna kept his foot on the accelerator and the cars collided at 270 km/h (170 mph) and went off the track, went through the gravel trap and slammed into the tire barrier, making Senna world champion.

Following the second championship-deciding collision in two years, Jackie Stewart interviewed Senna at the subsequent race in Australia (where Senna won pole and led for 61 laps before gearbox trouble forced him to slide off into a tyre barrier) and brought up a number of controversial collisions in which Senna had been involved over the last few years, stating that Senna had made more contact with other cars and drivers in the last four years than all the champions before him. An irritated Senna questioned how someone like Stewart, himself a triple world champion, could ask questions like he did, knowing the pressure under which drivers raced and famously said: "Being a racing driver means you are racing with other people, and if you no longer go for a gap that exists, you are no longer a racing driver."

A year later, after taking his third world championship, Senna admitted that he has deliberately crashed into Prost at the previous year's Japanese Grand Prix, and he then explained to the press his actions and motives at Suzuka that year. He maintained that prior to qualifying fastest, he had sought and received assurances from race officials that pole position would be changed to the left, clean side of the track (where the racing line was), only to find this decision reversed by Jean-Marie Balestre after he had taken pole. Senna said that he was not going to accept what he saw as unfair decision-making by Balestre, including his 1989 disqualification and the incorrect pole position in 1990. Senna stated that no matter what happened, he would not yield the corner and that Prost taking his normal racing line would result in an accident. Prost later went on record criticising Senna's actions as "disgusting", saying that he seriously considered retiring from the sport after that incident. During an interview with Eurosport at the Australian Grand Prix Prost revealed that he had seen the Honda engine telemetry at Suzuka and that it showed that Senna had kept his foot absolutely flat through the 4th gear corner when he had hit Prost- Senna had not even taken his foot off the accelerator to change down to 4th for this corner, revealing that Senna had taken Prost out on purpose.

1991

In , Senna became the youngest ever three-time world champion, taking seven wins and increasing his pole position record to 60 from 127 events. Prost, because of the downturn in performance at Ferrari, the likes of which littered the team's history, was no longer a serious competitor. In preseason testing, Senna made public misgivings about the car's competitiveness with the new Honda V12, stating that the engine was not as powerful as the prior year's V10. Senna won the first four races in Phoenix, Brazil, Imola and Monaco as his rivals struggled to match his pace and reliability. By midseason, Nigel Mansell in the quick Adrian Newey designed Williams-Renault was able to put up a challenge later in the season, having only scored 6 points by the time Senna had 40 points. Before the Mexican Grand Prix, Senna was injured in a jet-skiing accident near São Paulo for which he required stitches on the back of his head. During qualifying for that Grand Prix, he attempted to take the banked 180-degree Peraltada corner (Mexico City circuit's fastest corner) faster than normal, ending up spinning off the track and rolling over the car after crashing into a tyre barrier. At the British Grand Prix at Silverstone, Senna's car had come to a halt on the final lap, but he was not left stranded out on the circuit, as race-winner Mansell pulled over on his parade lap and allowed the Brazilian to ride on the Williams side-pod back to the pits. Senna then had an enormous accident during testing at the very fast Hockenheim circuit in Germany where his car flew 15 feet into the air after a tyre failure, and turned over several times upon coming down onto the track. The car was destroyed and Senna had to spend the night in hospital in nearby Mannheim, but he was able to compete in the German Grand Prix at the forested Hockenheim circuit soon after, but ran out of fuel mere laps before the end. At the Spanish Grand Prix, Senna and Mansell went wheel-to-wheel with only centimetres to spare, at over 320 km/h (200 mph) down the main straight, a race which the Briton eventually won.

Though Senna's consistency, the car's competitiveness, and the Williams' unreliability at the beginning of the season gave him an early advantage, Senna insisted that Honda step up their engine development program and demanded further improvements to the MP4/6 before it was too late. These modifications, including modifications introduced at Hungary and variable inlet trumpets introduced at Belgium enabled him to make a late-season push, and he won three more races to secure the championship, which was settled in Japan when Mansell (who needed to win), went off at the first corner while running third and beached his Williams in the gravel trap. Senna finished second, handing the victory to teammate Gerhard Berger at the last corner as a thank-you gesture for his support over the season. Senna was planning to move to the Williams team for the 1992 season, but Honda's CEO, Nobuhiko Kawamoto, personally requested that he remain at McLaren-Honda, which Senna did out of a sense of loyalty; in addition to Alain Prost's recommendation Honda had played an important part of bringing Senna with them to McLaren.

That year, as had been the case in 1988 and 1990, Senna won the "International Racing Driver Award" granted by British magazine Autosport annually. The award was presented by Stirling Moss and Senna was interviewed on stage by Formula 1 commentator, Murray Walker. During the interview, Senna confirmed that at the Fédération Internationale du Sport Automobile (FISA) gala dinner in Paris the day before, under the auspices of Jackie Stewart, Senna had given one of his helmets to his renowned foe, Jean-Marie Balestre, because of the sincere atmosphere that presented itself and as an insulting psychological gesture.

1992

In 1992, Senna's determination to win manifested itself in dismay at McLaren's inability to challenge Williams's all-conquering FW14B car. The FW14B, thanks in part to its aerodynamic-enhancing active suspension and powerful Renault V10 engine was much faster than any other car that season. McLaren's new car for the season had several shortcomings. A delay occurred in getting the new MP4/7A model running (it was McLaren's first car with a semi-automatic gearbox and it debuted in the third race of the season, the Brazilian Grand Prix) and in addition to lacking active suspension, the new car suffered from reliability issues and was unpredictable in fast corners, while its Honda V12 engine was no longer the most powerful on the circuit. During practice for the second race of the season in Mexico on a badly maintained and extremely bumpy circuit (thanks to it being located in a geologically active area) Senna and other drivers were heavily critical of, his car hit a bump at one of the circuit's Esses corners that caused a loss of downforce and a hard crash into a concrete retaining wall. He had to be extricated from the car by circuit doctors wearing a neck brace; although he raced the next day, albeit retiring from the race due to gearbox failure. Senna scored wins in Monaco, Hungary, and Italy that year. During qualifying for the Belgian Grand Prix, French driver Érik Comas crashed heavily and Senna was the first to arrive at the scene. Senna could hear the stricken car's engine revving at max RPM, and he exited his car and ran across the track to help the Frenchman and shut off the car's screaming engine (which could have blown and started a fire at any moment), disregarding his own safety in an effort to aid a fellow driver. He later visited Comas in the hospital. His actions won universal praise from within Formula One and seemed to soften his hard-nosed image. Senna finished fourth overall in the championship, behind the Williams duo of Mansell and Riccardo Patrese, and Benetton's Michael Schumacher.

Senna's relationship with German rising star Michael Schumacher, who was showing exceptional form at every race was never a good one, possibly because Senna saw Schumacher as a threat to his supremacy in F1. At the 1992 Brazilian Grand Prix, Schumacher accused Senna of 'playing around' while attempting to overtake Senna, who had a problem with his engine (a fact that Schumacher was apparently unaware of at the time). At the French Grand Prix, Schumacher collided with Senna, resulting in Senna's retirement. Senna later confronted Schumacher, who admitted responsibility for the accident. At a test session for the German Grand Prix, Senna and Schumacher had a confrontation in the pits, with Senna grabbing Schumacher by the collar and accusing him of endangering him by blocking him on the track.

Questions about Senna's intentions for the upcoming  season lingered throughout 1992, as he did not have a contract with any team by the end of that year. Ferrari had offered him a contract which Senna discussed with Niki Lauda, but decided to decline the offer. He felt the McLaren cars were becoming less competitive than in previous years, especially given Honda's decision to abandon the sport at the end of 1992 due to economic issues and McLaren's lack of active suspension relating to rival Williams.

Given this scenario, Senna secured an IndyCar testing session with the support of compatriot and Penske driver, Emerson Fittipaldi. In December 1992, in fact, Senna visited Firebird International Raceway in Chandler, Arizona near Phoenix in the United States to test a 1992 Penske PC-21 CART Indianapolis car. Unlike the more advanced F1 cars, this IndyCar was powered by a turbo Chevrolet-Ilmor V8, had a traditional transmission with clutch pedal and iron brakes, and was markedly heavier due to its bigger physical size in comparison to a smaller Formula One car; IndyCar teams were run with significantly smaller budgets than F1 teams and did not have to make their own cars. To familiarise himself, Senna initially ran 14 relatively slow laps before completing a further 10 laps on the same tyres and setting a best time of 49.09 seconds. By comparison, Fittipaldi had set a best time of 49.70 seconds, which he later improved to 48.5 seconds, only by using the new 1993 Penske PC-22 at his disposal during this test session. In a 2018 interview, Fittipaldi revealed that Penske boss Roger Penske was ready to enter a third car for Senna to drive at the 1993 Indianapolis 500 - one of the most prestigious and important races in the world and a race that defending champion Mansell was competing at (who had left F1 for CART) - but when McLaren boss Ron Dennis found out it was a very serious deal and he promptly banned Senna from competing at Indianapolis.

1993

For , attempts were made by McLaren boss Ron Dennis to secure a supply of the dominant Renault V10 engines that Williams had found great success with. When these failed, Senna went to Williams himself and sought to take one of their two open rides, as defending champion Nigel Mansell joined the IndyCar Series for 1993 and longtime second driver Riccardo Patrese left to drive at Benetton alongside Michael Schumacher. However, despite Senna going so far as to be willing to forfeit his annual salary just to drive one of Williams' Renaults, this too would fail. Alain Prost was returning to F1 for the first time since the penultimate race of the 1991 season (he had been fired by Ferrari prior to the end of 1991, received a massive severance package as part of a non-compete clause, and took leave for the 1992 season) and filled one of the vacant Williams seats. His contract included a caveat that he had veto power over who he would team with in the other car for 1993; since he still had ill will toward his former McLaren teammate, Prost used that veto to freeze out Senna and force him into what was now a lame-duck season for the Brazilian at McLaren. Faced with this, during the post-race press conference of the 1992 Portuguese Grand Prix at the Estoril Circuit, an infuriated Senna called Prost a coward, leading to some commentators stating that what Prost had done was no different from Senna vetoing Derek Warwick from joining Lotus in 1986, but they did not take into account that Senna's chances of winning the championship were much higher in 1993.

By this time, McLaren was forced to take a customer supply of Ford V8 engines, which were two specifications behind that of Ford's then factory team, Benetton. McLaren hoped to make up for the inferior horsepower with mechanical sophistication, including an effective active suspension system – though the system itself proved difficult at times, especially for new teammate Michael Andretti. With this plan, Dennis finally persuaded Senna to stay with McLaren. The Brazilian, however, agreed to do so only for the first race in South Africa, where he would assess whether McLaren's equipment was competitive enough for him to put in a good season. After driving McLaren's 1993 car, the McLaren MP4/8, Senna concluded that the well-balanced new MP4/8 car had surprising potential, albeit with a Ford V8 engine down on power relative to Prost's Renault V10 and less so on the Benetton's factory V8. Senna thus extended his deal with McLaren on a race-by-race basis instead of a full-year contract, ending up staying for the whole of 1993 in any event. Reportedly, this engagement was on a $1 million per race basis and, despite midseason testing with a Lamborghini V12 proved encouraging, with McLaren then signing an engine supply deal with Peugeot for the  season, it all proved insufficient to continue to retain Senna past 1993.

In the opening race in South Africa, Senna finished in second place after surviving a collision with Schumacher. Senna won in changing conditions in Brazil and Donington. The latter has often been regarded as one of Senna's greatest victories, in the process setting a record for the fastest lap in an F1 race driving through the then speed-unrestricted pit lane. In cold, wet, rainy conditions typical of England in April he was fifth at the first corner and led the race at the end of the first lap going on to lap all but second place in a race where up to seven pit stops were required by some drivers for rain or slick tyres. Senna then scored a second-place finish in Spain and a record-breaking sixth win at Monaco, breaking Graham Hill's record of five. After Monaco, the sixth race of the season, Senna unexpectedly led the championship from Prost in the Williams-Renault. As the season progressed, Alain Prost and Damon Hill asserted the superiority of their Williams-Renault cars, while Senna suffered mechanical failures in Imola, Canada, Britain, Hungary, and Portugal, where Prost took his 4th world championship, losing apparently none of the skill he was not able to use during his 1992 sabbatical. Senna won the penultimate race of the season in Japan, which was marked by an incident involving Jordan's rookie Eddie Irvine, twice unlapping himself against Senna. Immediately after the race, Senna angrily stormed into the Jordan team's garage and said to the Irishman "You're driving like a f***ing idiot! You're not a racing driver, you're a f***ing idiot!” before punching him in the side of the head. Following that incident, the stewards gave Senna a two race suspended ban for 1994. However, after a discussion between Senna and the president of the FIA, a compromise was reached by removing the ban, considering the exemplary attitude of Senna towards his fellow drivers. The decision created some polemic back at the time, both amongst drivers and in the press, considering that during all the 1993 season, Prost was under threat of a four-race ban for using words to criticize the president of the FIA, which means that punching a fellow driver in the face was not as bad as criticizing the FIA.

The season concluded in Australia, with Senna's 41st and last F1 career win, as well as the last win for an active-suspension F1 car (ironically, Senna had the first victory for a car with this technology in Monaco 1987). The win in Adelaide was an emotional one due to Senna ending his successful career with McLaren and defeating his biggest rival, Prost, for the last time. Because of the Frenchman's imminent retirement from the sport, Senna surprised the F1 community by openly welcoming Prost on the top step of the podium, which many considered a sign of pacification between the duo. Overall, Senna finished the championship second to Prost.

Williams (1994)

For 1994, Senna was able to finally join the Williams team after Prost retired and was reportedly paid a $20 million salary. Senna was assigned car number 2, with teammate Damon Hill running car number 0 due to Prost, who would have been assigned number 1 had he returned, retiring. With Senna's arrival, a new sponsor came as well. Rothmans International came aboard as the primary backer for Williams, with Senna being one of their first drivers in the familiar white and navy livery.

Rule changes for 1994 had banned active suspension, traction control, and ABS. During preseason testing, the new Williams FW16 car exhibited none of the superiority of the FW15C and FW14B cars that preceded it, and Senna found himself in close running with the Benetton B194 of Michael Schumacher. Senna expressed his discomfort with the handling of his car, stating, "I have a very negative feeling about driving the car and driving it on the limit and so on ... Some of that is down to the lack of electronic change. Also, the car has its own characteristics which I'm not fully confident in yet." Senna further added, "It's going to be a season with lots of accidents, and I'll risk saying that we'll be lucky if something really serious doesn't happen."

The first race of the season was at Interlagos in Brazil, where Senna took pole position. He took an early lead, but Schumacher's Benetton was never far behind. Schumacher took the race lead after passing Senna in the pits. While trying for a win, he pushed too hard and spun the car coming out of Junção corner on lap 56, stalling it and retiring from the race. The second race was the inaugural Pacific Grand Prix at Aida, where Senna again placed the car on the pole. However, after being beaten to the first corner by second-qualifier Schumacher, he was hit from behind in the first corner by Mika Häkkinen and his race came to a definitive end when, while spinning backwards into the first corner's gravel trap, the Ferrari driven by Nicola Larini T-boned the Williams. Both drivers retired with front-suspension damage. Hill also retired with transmission problems, while Schumacher took the victory again.

It was Senna's worst start to a Formula One season, failing to finish or score points in the first two races, despite taking pole position both times. Schumacher was leading Senna in the Drivers' Championship by 20 points. In occasion of the 20th anniversary of Senna's death, Ferrari president Luca Cordero di Montezemolo revealed that, on 27 April 1994, he had held discussions at his home in Bologna with Senna about a future Ferrari engagement.

Season controversies and end
The 1994 season was the subject of sweeping rule changes, most notably banning the use of electronic "driver aids" such as active suspension, anti-lock brakes, traction control and launch control. From the start, suspicion of foul play mainly involving the Benetton team was said to have troubled Senna. For example, instead of returning to the pit area after his first lap retirement at the Pacific Grand Prix, Senna opted to stand near the first corner and watch the cars complete the race to see if he could detect whether any now banned traction control system was being used. He returned to the Williams pits after the race, suspicious that the Benetton car was illegal. Indeed, in an interview for the 20th anniversary of Ayrton Senna's death, his then-teammate, Damon Hill, revealed that Senna had "concluded that there was, what he regarded, as unusual noises from the engine" with "special tweak" giving Benetton an advantage.

The season ended at the Australian Grand Prix in Adelaide, where the first-corner chicane at the Adelaide Street Circuit was renamed the "Senna Chicane". Schumacher went on to win the driver's world championship title controversially after a collision that forced his retirement and that of his rival, and Senna's teammate, Damon Hill. At the official FIA conference after the race, the German dedicated his title to Senna.

Death

The 1994 San Marino Grand Prix was held on the Autodromo Enzo e Dino Ferrari circuit located in Imola, Italy, between 28 April, and 1 May 1994. The European leg of the F1 season, starting at Imola, was traditionally considered the beginning of the yearly competition. Senna, who did not finish the two opening races of the season, declared that this was where his season would start, with 14 races, as opposed to 16, in which to win the title. Williams brought modified FW16s to Imola in an attempt to improve the car's handling. During the afternoon qualifying session, Senna's compatriot and protégé Rubens Barrichello was involved in a serious accident when his car became airborne at the Variante Bassa chicane and hit the tyre-wall and fence. Barrichello suffered a broken nose and arm, and withdrew from the event. Barrichello reported that Senna was the first person he saw upon regaining consciousness.

During Saturday qualifying, Austrian rookie Roland Ratzenberger was killed after the front wing of his Simtek-Ford broke entering the  Villeneuve corner, sending the car into the concrete retaining wall at high speed. Senna immediately visited the accident scene and medical centre. There he was met by FIA Medical Chief Professor Sid Watkins, who suggested to a tearful Senna that he should retire from racing and take up fishing (a hobby they both shared), to which Senna replied that he could not stop racing. Senna was later called in front of the stewards for commandeering an official car and climbing the medical centre fence, and a row ensued, although Senna was not punished. Senna spent his final morning on Sunday talking to former teammate and rival Alain Prost to discuss the re-establishment of the Grand Prix Drivers' Association, a driver's union, with the aim of improving safety in Formula One. Prost had retired from the sport at the end of the 1993 season and was now a media presenter. As the most senior driver in competition, Senna offered to take the role of leader, starting from the next race in Monaco. During the drivers' briefing, concerns had been raised about the mainly promotional use of a Porsche 911 lead car for the warm-up lap, with organizers agreeing to abandon the practice.

At the start of the Grand Prix, Senna retained the lead from his chief rival Michael Schumacher, but proceedings were soon interrupted by a startline accident. JJ Lehto's Benetton-Ford stalled and was hit by the Lotus-Mugen Honda of Pedro Lamy. A wheel and debris landed in the main grandstand, injuring eight fans and a police officer. The safety car, a sporty version of the Opel Vectra medium family saloon, was deployed for several laps. However, the Vectra's lack of speed proved detrimental to the racers, as the slower pace allowed the tyres of the Formula One cars to cool, thus decreasing their pressure. Senna pulled alongside the Vectra and gestured to the driver, Max Angelelli, to increase his speed. On lap 6, the race resumed and Senna immediately set a quick pace, completing the third-fastest lap of the race, followed by Schumacher.

The red flag was shown as a consequence of the accident. Within two minutes of crashing, Senna was extracted from his race car by Watkins and his medical team, including intensive care anaesthetist Giovanni Gordini. The initial treatment took place by the side of the car, with Senna having a weak heartbeat and significant blood loss from his temporal artery being ruptured. At this point, Senna had already lost around 4.5 litres of blood, constituting 90% of his blood volume. Because of Senna's grave neurological condition, Watkins performed an on-site tracheotomy and requested the immediate airlifting of Senna to Bologna's Maggiore Hospital under the supervision of Gordini.

At 18:40 (16:40 GMT), the head of the hospital's emergency department, Maria Teresa Fiandri made the announcement that Senna had died, but said the official time of death under Italian law was 14:17 (12:17 GMT), which is when he impacted the wall and his brain stopped functioning. Watkins later said that as soon as he saw Senna's fully dilated pupils, he knew that his brainstem was inactive and that he would not survive. The right-front wheel and suspension are believed to have been sent back into the cockpit, striking Senna on the right side of his helmet, forcing his head back against the headrest. A piece of upright attached to the wheel had partially penetrated his helmet and made a large indentation in his forehead. In addition, it appeared that a jagged piece of the upright assembly had penetrated the helmet visor just above his right eye. Senna sustained fatal skull fractures, brain injuries and a ruptured temporal artery, a major blood vessel supplying the face and scalp. According to Fiandri, any one of these three injuries would likely have killed him.

It was later revealed that when the medical staff examined Senna's vehicle, a furled Austrian flag was discovered—he had intended to raise it in honour of Ratzenberger after the race. Photographs of Senna being treated on the track by emergency medical personnel were taken by Senna's friend and Autosprints picture editor, Angelo Orsi. Out of respect, those photographs have never been made officially public.

Funeral

Senna's death was considered by many of his Brazilian fans to be a national tragedy, and the Government of Brazil declared three days of national mourning. The Italian Air Force offered to fly the coffin back to Brazil, but the Senna family wished that it return home in a Brazilian plane. Contrary to airline policy and out of respect, Senna's coffin was allowed to be flown back to his home country in the passenger cabin of a VARIG McDonnell-Douglas MD-11 airliner, accompanied by his distraught younger brother, Leonardo, and close friends. The plane was escorted by fighter jets into São Paulo–Guarulhos International Airport on 4 May 1994, where it was met by the Mayor of São Paulo, Paulo Maluf, and the state's governor, Luiz Antônio Fleury. The coffin was carried by soldiers from the Air Force Police to a fire engine, where eight cadets from the Military Police Academy mounted guard as it carried the coffin on the 20-mile (32.2 km) journey into the city. Leading the motorcade were 17 police motorbikes, and 2,500 policemen lined the route to keep the crowds at bay.

An estimated three million people flocked to the streets of Senna's home city of São Paulo to offer him their salute. This is widely accepted as the largest recorded gathering of mourners in modern times. Over 200,000 people filed past as his body lay in state at the Legislative Assembly building in Ibirapuera Park. After the public viewing, a 21-gun salute was fired by the 2nd Artillery Brigade and seven Brazilian Air Force jets flew in a diamond formation as the funeral procession made its way to Morumbi Cemetery. Many prominent motor-racing figures attended Senna's state funeral, which took place on 5 May, such as team managers Ken Tyrrell, Peter Collins, Ron Dennis, and Frank Williams, and driver Jackie Stewart. The pallbearers included drivers: Gerhard Berger, Michele Alboreto, Alain Prost, Thierry Boutsen, Damon Hill, Rubens Barrichello, Roberto Moreno, Derek Warwick, Maurício Gugelmin, Hans Stuck, Johnny Herbert, Pedro Lamy, Maurizio Sala, Raul Boesel, Emerson Fittipaldi, Wilson Fittipaldi, and Christian Fittipaldi. Neither Sid Watkins nor Jo Ramírez, the McLaren team coordinator, could bear to attend because they were so grief-stricken. Senna's family did not allow FOM president Bernie Ecclestone, a friend of Senna's, to attend the ceremony, after an altercation between Ecclestone and Senna's brother Leonardo at Imola regarding Ecclestone's misconstrued reaction to the news of Ayrton's death and the fact that the race had not been abandoned after his accident. FIA President Max Mosley instead attended the funeral of Ratzenberger on 7 May, in Salzburg, Austria. Mosley said in a press conference 10 years later, "I went to his funeral because everyone went to Senna's. I thought it was important that somebody went to his." Senna's grave bears the epitaph "Nada pode me separar do amor de Deus", which means "Nothing can separate me from the love of God" (a reference to Romans 8:38–39).

A testament to the adulation he inspired among fans worldwide was the scene at the Tokyo headquarters of Honda, where McLaren-Honda cars were typically displayed after each race. Upon his death, so many floral tributes were received, they overwhelmed the large exhibition lobby. This was despite the fact Senna no longer drove for a Honda-powered team. Senna had a special relationship with company founder Soichiro Honda and was beloved in Japan, where he achieved a near-mythic status. For the next race at Monaco, the FIA decided to leave the first two grid positions empty and painted them with the colours of the Brazilian and the Austrian flags, to honour Senna and Ratzenberger.

Italian prosecution
Italian law requires that accidents resulting in a fatality must be investigated for any criminal culpability, with the associated scene of the accident secured and the activities that led to the fatality, suspended forthwith. Senna's death was thus the subject of criminal proceedings in Italy, which saw key Williams team members investigated and charged with manslaughter. The original trial in 1997 concluded with acquittals on the grounds that the prosecution had failed to prove its case. This prosecution culminated with verdict no. 15050 handed down by the Italian Supreme Court of Cassation on 13 April 2007, which stated: "It has been determined that the accident was caused by a steering column failure. This failure was caused by badly designed and badly executed modifications. The responsibility of this falls on Patrick Head, culpable of omitted control". Head, however, was never arrested because the Italian statute of limitation for manslaughter is 7 years and 6 months, and the final verdict was pronounced 13 years after the accident.

The criminal charges focused on the car's steering column, which was found to have sheared off at a point where a modification had been made. The prosecution alleged that the column had failed, causing the accident, and the Williams team conceded to this failure, but only as caused by the impact at the Tamburello corner. Senna had not liked the position of his FW16's steering wheel relative to the seating position and had asked for the former to be changed. Head and Adrian Newey satisfied Senna's request by having the existing column cut and extended with a smaller-diameter piece of tubing, which was welded together with reinforcing plates. The modification was carried out in this manner as there was no time to manufacture a new longer steering column in time for the race.

Motorsport career outside Formula One

Senna did not participate in many other forms of motorsport once he reached Formula One.

He took part in the 1984 Nürburgring Race of Champions, an exhibition race where all drivers competed in identical examples of the then-new Mercedes 190E 2.3–16 with minor race modifications. The race was held on the then newly-opened Nürburgring GP Track, before the European Grand Prix. Notably, this race involved several past and present Formula 1 drivers, including Stirling Moss and past World Champions Jack Brabham, Denny Hulme and Alan Jones, driving identical touring cars. Alain Prost started from pole position, but Senna took the lead in the first corner of the first lap, winning the race ahead of Niki Lauda and Carlos Reutemann. After the race, Senna was quoted as saying, "Now I know I can do it." Senna was a last-minute inclusion in the Mercedes race, taking over from Emerson Fittipaldi.

In 1984 he also took part in the Nürburgring round of the 1984 World Sportscar Championship, driving a Porsche 956 for New-Man Joest Racing, alongside Henri Pescarolo and Stefan Johansson. He finished in 8th place but impressed the team and his co-drivers.

He took part in the Masters Karting Paris Bercy event in 1993, an indoor karting competition held on a temporary circuit at the Palais Omnisports de Paris-Bercy. This event is notable for being the stage for the last on-track duel between Alain Prost and Ayrton Senna.

Personal life

Senna was a devout Catholic once saying: "Just because I believe in God, just because I have faith in God, it doesn't mean that I'm immune. It doesn't mean that I'm immortal" (1989). He often read the Bible on long flights from São Paulo to Europe. According to his sister, Senna had sought strength from the Bible on the morning of his death: "On that final morning, he woke and opened his Bible and read a text that he would receive the greatest gift of all, which was God himself."

As his profile rose, Senna expressed concern over the poor in Brazil. After his death, he was discovered to have secretly donated millions of his personal fortune (estimated at $400 million) to help poor children. Shortly before his death, he created the framework for an organisation dedicated to Brazilian children, which later became the Instituto Ayrton Senna (IAS).

Senna was awarded the No. 1 driver of the year by the editor of the Autocourse annual 3 times, in 1988, 1991, and 1993, as well as taking the runner-up spot in 1985, 1989, 1990, and 1992. However, Senna was so outraged by the editor dropping him from No. 1 to No. 2 in the 1990 listings as a result of Senna's first corner crash at Suzuka in 1990 with Alain Prost—a piece of driving the editor considered completely reckless—that despite being given the No. 1 driver award in 1991, Senna refused to write the usually customary foreword by the year's World Champion; Honda's Head of Racing wrote the foreword instead. The Autocourse editor wrote in 1993 that Senna had "intense egocentricity and uniquely flawed genius" and "matchless genius in the wet". In the 2000 edition of Autocourse celebrating 50 years of Formula 1, the editor acknowledged that "Senna was the one driver who genuinely cared where he was ranked in the Top 10 drivers by the AUTOCOURSE editorial" and that Senna took being placed below his rivals as a personal slight.

Senna was often quoted as using driving as a means for self-discovery and racing as a metaphor for life, saying, "The harder I push, the more I find within myself. I am always looking for the next step, a different world to go into, areas where I have not been before. It's lonely driving a Grand Prix car, but very absorbing. I have experienced new sensations, and I want more. That is my excitement, my motivation."

Towards the end of his career, Senna became increasingly preoccupied with the dangers of his profession. On the morning of his death, he initiated the reformation of the GPDA safety organisation, with which he had intended to work to improve the safety of his sport.

Senna owned several properties, including an organic farm in Tatuí, Brazil (where he built a go-kart track in 1991), a beach house in Angra dos Reis, Brazil, an apartment in São Paulo, Brazil, an apartment in Monaco, an estate in Sintra, on the Portuguese Riviera, and a house in Algarve, Portugal. 

Senna enjoyed a range of physical activities including running, waterskiing, jet skiing, and paddleboarding. He also had several hobbies, such as flying real and model planes and helicopters, boating, fishing, and riding his favourite Ducati motorbikes. His private jet was a British Aerospace 125, and he also piloted his own helicopter between his residences in Brazil along with travelling to races. For his 29th birthday in 1989, the Brazilian Air Force gave Senna a flight on one of their jet fighters (a Dassault Mirage III), which bears commemorative livery and is now exhibited at the Aerospace Museum of Rio de Janeiro. After a 3 ship flyover of the type at the 1990 Australian Grand Prix, Senna was given a joyride in an RAAF F-111C

Senna was close friends with McLaren teammate Gerhard Berger, and the two were always playing practical jokes on each other. Berger is quoted as saying, "He taught me a lot about our sport, I taught him to laugh." In the documentary film The Right to Win, made in 2004 as a tribute to Senna, Frank Williams notably recalls that as good a driver as Senna was, ultimately "he was an even greater man outside of the car than he was in it."

In 1992, Senna received a fine and a temporary driving ban in the UK after driving a Porsche at speeds up to 121 mph (194.7 km/h) on the M25 near London.

Senna was married to Lilian de Vasconcelos Souza from 1981 until 1982. Vasconcelos, whom he had known since childhood, had difficulty adapting to her husband's racing life in England. Vasconcelos later said: "I was his second passion. His first passion was racing... There was nothing more important in the world for him, not family, not wife, nothing." Though he did not have much of an income early in his racing career, Senna insisted on supporting his wife with no help from his father out of a sense of pride. The marriage ended in divorce. Senna then courted Adriane Yamin, daughter of an entrepreneur from São Paulo, who was 15 years old when they began the relationship in 1985 and often chaperoned by her mother during meetings with Senna. They were briefly engaged, but the relationship was broken off by Senna in late 1988. Senna dated Brazilian TV star Xuxa from late 1988 until 1990. He then dated Christine Ferracciu, who lived with him at his homes in Monaco and Portugal, on and off between 1990 and 1991. Senna also had an affair with American model Carol Alt, and briefly dated models Marjorie Andrade and Elle Macpherson. At the time of his death, Senna was in a relationship with Brazilian model, and later TV personality, Adriane Galisteu.

One of the most extravagant claims involving Senna's past partners was made by Edilaine de Barros, a former model better known as Marcella Praddo. She alleged that the couple dated from 1992 to 1994. Barros' child, Victoria, was born weeks after Senna's death, and claims that Senna was the father were soon made but abandoned following their rejection by the Senna family. Years later, after joining a religious sect, the former model was convinced to sue against the estate of Senna. In 2000, DNA tests of hair and saliva samples given by Senna's parents conclusively proved that he was not the father of de Barros' child.

In his early years in Formula One, Senna was the subject of a smear campaign orchestrated by Nelson Piquet, ranging from Senna being regarded as a taxi driver to being homosexual given his failed marriage. According to a 1990 interview by Brazilian edition of Playboy, Senna declared that he lost his virginity at 13 years of age to a prostitute arranged by his cousin, and he also insinuated that he had a relationship with Piquet's would-be wife (hence Piquet's acrimony).

Former Formula One driver Bruno Senna is the nephew of Senna (being his sister Viviane's son) of whom he said in 1993: "If you think I'm fast, just wait until you see my nephew Bruno." Due to the death of his uncle, Bruno initially gave up motor racing at his family's insistence. He eventually raced in F1 between 2010 and 2012, in the latter year for the Williams team, which was a decision that, reportedly, had a significant emotional impact on the Senna family and was seen by some as a signing only resulting from Bruno's big name and the money it could bring.

Non-racing commercial activities

In the late 1980s, to take advantage of the close relationship Honda had formed with Senna, the Japanese company asked him to help fine-tune the Honda NSX's suspension setting during its final development stages. Test runs were conducted at various circuits, including five sessions with prototypes at the Suzuka Circuit where chief NSX engineer Shigeru Uehara and his team were present to gather Senna's direct input. Senna found the prototype NSX initially lacked chassis stiffness to the level to which he was accustomed, so the final production version was further reinforced to his satisfaction.

Senna reportedly had access to three of these cars: a black 1993 NSX in Brazil, which he ordered to his specifications, bearing license plate BSS-8888, which represents his initials for "Beco" – his childhood nickname – "Senna da Silva" and 8 to commemorate his first F1 championship in 1988; a red one with licence plate SX-25-59, which was loaned to him by Honda Portugal; a black one purchased by Antonio Carlos de Almeida Braga, who was a close personal friend, manager, and mentor of Ayrton Senna.
Senna also appeared in different commercials for the 4th generation Honda Prelude.

Senna was also instrumental in bringing Audi cars into his native country, both as an import and manufacturing business. Audi entered Brazil in 1994 via Senna's company, Senna Import, founded in 1993. Sales began in April that year, just a month before his untimely death. In 1999, Audi Senna was created as a joint venture of Audi with Senna Import. Aside from the black NSX mentioned above, Senna's other personal car in 1994 was a silver Audi 100 S4 Avant.

In the early 1990s, Senna developed his own merchandise brand represented by a logo with a double S, after his full surname, "Senna da Silva". This logo is meant to represent an S chicane on a racing circuit. The Senna brand was used for apparel, watches, bicycles (Carraro), motorcycles and boats. Hublot, TAG Heuer, and Universal Genève have created limited-edition watches to honour Senna, both during his lifetime and after his death.

Legacy

Many safety improvements were made in the sport following Senna's and Ratzenberger's deaths and Barrichello's crash. These include improved crash barriers, redesigned tracks, higher crash safety standards (such as larger sills along the driver cockpit) and major cuts to engine power. The Tamburello corner and other parts of the Imola circuit were altered for 1995. This was despite calls for action in 1989, after a serious high-speed crash in which Senna's friend, Gerhard Berger, suffered burns to his hand. No action took place after that crash because, following an inspection by Senna and Berger, they ended up siding with officials who had, for years, claimed that the wall could not be moved further back due to a river nearby. Revised on-track medical procedures also saw personnel hold up curtains at crash sites, to prevent the public from viewing distressing images as had occurred on live television with Senna.

In July 1994, the Brazil national football team dedicated their World Cup victory to Senna, and collectively held a banner on the field after defeating Italy in the final. Senna had met various members of the squad, including Ronaldo and Leonardo, three months earlier in Paris, telling them "this is our year". Throughout the rest of the 1994 season, Senna was commemorated in various ways. Damon Hill, along with Michael Schumacher, dedicated their individual success to Senna with Hill's victory in the Spanish Grand Prix and Schumacher's world-championship victory in the Australian Grand Prix.

A few months before his death, Senna had discussed with his sister the foundation of a charitable organization, based on a desire to contribute to those less fortunate in a more organised and effective manner. After his death, Viviane Senna set up the Instituto Ayrton Senna in his honour, which has invested nearly US$80 million over the last 12 years in social programs and actions in partnership with schools, government, NGOs, and the private sector, aimed at offering children and teenagers from low-income backgrounds the skills and opportunities they need to develop their full potential as persons, citizens, and future professionals. The foundation is officially advised by Bernie Ecclestone, Alain Prost, and Gerhard Berger. The Senninha ("Little Senna") cartoon character, born in 1993/94, was another means by which Senna extended his role-model status in favour of Brazilian children.

In his home country of Brazil, the main freeway from the international airport to São Paulo and a tunnel along the route to the heart of the city are named in his honour. Also, one of the most important freeways of Rio de Janeiro is named after Senna ("Avenida Ayrton Senna"). The main road in Senna's Portuguese resort at Quinta do Lago, Algarve, was also dedicated to him, because his villa there was very near (but not on) this road. A portion of the Interlagos Circuit in São Paulo is named the "Senna Esse Chicane" in his honour and decorated with commissioned art from beloved Brazilian artist Luciana Bermelho. In the English town of Reading, Berkshire, where Senna lived for a short period of time, a street in the suburb of Tilehurst was named after him.

In April 2000, Senna was inducted into the International Motorsports Hall of Fame. That year, the UK public also voted Senna's opening lap of the 1993 European Grand Prix, the 43rd in the list of the 100 Greatest Sporting Moments.

In 2004, a book called Ayrton: The Hero Revealed (original title: Ayrton: O Herói Revelado) was published in Brazil for the 10th anniversary of his death. Senna remains a national hero in Brazil and his grave attracts more visitors than the graves of John F. Kennedy, Marilyn Monroe, and Elvis Presley combined.

In addition, to mark the 10th anniversary of Senna's death, on 21 April 2004, over 10,000 people attended a charity match in a football stadium near Imola. The game was organised by several devoted Italian and Canadian fans of Senna, bringing the Brazil team that won the 1994 World Cup to face the "Nazionale Piloti", an exhibition team composed exclusively of top race car drivers. Senna had been a part of the latter in 1985. Michael Schumacher, Jarno Trulli, Rubens Barrichello, Fernando Alonso, and many others faced the likes of Dunga, Careca, Taffarel, and several of the team that won the FIFA World Cup in the United States 10 years earlier. The match finished 5–5 and the money was donated to the IAS. Viviane Senna, the president of the IAS, was also involved in the kick-off of this match. That same weekend, Bernie Ecclestone revealed that he still believed Senna was and remained the best F1 driver he had ever seen.

Since his death, Senna has been the subject of several songs (either wholly dedicated to him or simply referring to him) including by: Italian singer-songwriter Lucio Dalla (song titled "Ayrton"), Italian rock band The Rock Alchemist, whose 2012 song "Live or Die" and their 2018 video for "Live Or Die" are inspired by the life and character of Ayrton Senna, Jazz pianist Kim Pensyl; Japanese jazz-fusion guitarist and T-square bandleader Masahiro Andoh (references in songs such as "Faces" and subsequent revisions, like "The Face"); Chris Rea (on his song "Saudade"); Spanish band Delorean (2009 extended play entitled Ayrton Senna); British acid jazz band Corduroy (1994 song "Ayrton Senna").

Between 1996 and 1998, to pay tribute to Senna, the Italian motorcycle manufacturer Ducati produced three special "Senna" editions of their 916 superbike. Ducati was at the time owned by Claudio Castiglioni, a personal friend of Senna who was an avid Ducati owner and endorsed the release of this 916 in March 1994. In 2002, under the presidency of Castiglioni, MV Agusta also released the special-edition F4 750 Senna motorbike followed by the F4 Senna 1000 in 2006. In both instances, each edition was limited to 300 units and, just like with the Ducati, all profits from sales were donated to the Ayrton Senna Foundation. In 2013, Ducati also released a special edition of their new top-of-the-range sportbike, the 1199 Panigale S Senna. In 2014, the IAS commissioned a commemorative Vespa that was auctioned for charity. It was custom-painted in the colours of Ayrton Senna's helmet by Alan Mosca, the son of Senna's helmet design creator, Sid, based on more than 50 "T5 Pole Position" models of the PX125 scooter that Ayrton won as part of the award to Formula 1 polesitters introduced by Piaggio in 1985.

The organisers of the former Formula One Grand Prix street circuit in Adelaide, South Australia, renamed the first chicane the "Senna Chicane" in his honour in 1994, and also a road in the Adelaide suburb of Wingfield is named "Senna Road". A shortened version of the Adelaide circuit (which remains the site of Senna's last Formula One win) and the chicane remain in use for local motorsport events, and a commemorative concrete plaque installed in 1995, bearing Senna's signature and hand prints, is also located there. The Adelaide circuit was said to be a favourite of Senna's, and he was reportedly unhappy about the upcoming shift of venue from Adelaide to Melbourne in 1996. Other motorsports circuits have similarly named sections of their track after Senna, such as the Circuito de Jerez in Spain, Hockenheimring in Germany, the Circuit Gilles Villeneuve in Canada, the Snetterton Circuit in the UK, the Circuito do Estoril in Portugal, and the Autódromo Juan y Oscar Gálvez in Argentina.

He has been voted the best driver of all time in various motorsport polls, including F1 Racing magazine's 2004 poll, and German newspaper Bild am Sonntag's poll of current drivers in 2010. In 2009, a poll of 217 current and former Formula One drivers conducted by Autosport magazine named Senna as "the greatest Formula One driver who ever lived". In 2012, BBC Sport journalists voted Senna as the greatest Formula One driver of all time, after naming their top 20 greatest drivers in a countdown on their website. In 1993, a poll of F1 drivers gave Senna a near-unanimous vote as the best driver in F1.

The Japanese public ranked Senna 22nd in a 2006 survey of their favourite persons in history. The results were part of The Top 100 Historical Persons in Japan program broadcast by Nippon TV on 7 May that year.

In 2007, Prince Albert of Monaco unveiled a plaque in honour of Senna in a ceremony that was attended by Vivane Senna. An exhibition also took place that showcased Senna's victories around Monaco, along with his helmets that were borrowed from Senna's family and a selection of McLaren cars raced by Senna that were brought over from Motegi.

On 21 March 2010, on the day that would have marked Senna's 50th birthday, the football team Corinthians, which Senna supported, played a tape in memory of Senna which was also part of the theme played at the São Paulo Motor Show.

On 25 July 2010, the BBC motoring show, Top Gear paid an emotional tribute to Senna with British Formula One World Champion, Lewis Hamilton driving Senna's original MP4/4, with which he won the 1988 title. This was prior to the release of the BAFTA Award winning documentary named after him, Senna, directed by Asif Kapadia. In this documentary broadcast only once by the BBC, Senna is named the number one driver ever, by fellow racing drivers. A StudioCanal, Working Title Films, and Midfield Films documentary production, Senna was released to critical acclaim.

Since Senna's death, every Williams F1 car has incorporated a small Senna 'S' logo in its Formula 1 car to honour their former driver and in support of the IAS. A revised logo was featured in 2014 for the 20th anniversary of Senna's death.

In July 2013, Honda released a video of an audio-visual tribute on the Suzuka circuit in the dark, titled "Sound of Honda – Ayrton Senna 1989". Using the telemetry and sound of the Honda-powered McLaren MP4/5 driven by the Brazilian driver, Honda recreated the then lap record lap of 1:38.041 minutes by positioning speakers and lights along the 5.8 km track and activating them in synchronization with the race car's position during that lap. In May of that year, Honda also reconfirmed its return to the sport as McLaren's engine supplier from 2015, with both companies again leveraging on Senna's legend as part of their advertising campaign since.

On 25 October 2013, a holiday PlayStation 3 bundle with Gran Turismo 6 was announced which is dedicated to his memory, with some of the proceeds of this bundle going to help the IAS. This was not the first time that Senna was immortalized in a video game since, in 1992, Sega developed and published Ayrton Senna's Super Monaco GP II for the Sega Mega Drive, Master System and Game Gear. Apart from featuring advice from Senna himself, the tracks included Senna's own farm circuit in Tatuí, São Paulo and it was based on the 1991 F1 World Championship (albeit with fictitious rival drivers and teams due to licensing restrictions). This was then followed by the Japan-exclusive Ayrton Senna Personal Talk: Message for the Future for the Sega Saturn, which was a multimedia compact disc containing interviews with Senna overlaid with still images.

In March 2014, during the Brazilian Carnival celebrations, the samba group Unidos da Tijuca paid tribute to Senna in one of their parades in Rio de Janeiro. The group showcased his McLaren car along with other characters associated with speed, such as Sonic, The Flash, and Usain Bolt. The school won the coveted trophy for the best parade of 2014.

On 21 March 2014, Google had a special Doodle to honour Senna's 54th birthday that day.

In occasion of the 20th anniversary of Senna's death, on 29 April 2014, in partnership with the IAS, the Brazilian regional airline Azul Linhas Aereas paid tribute by baptizing its Embraer ERJ-195 (registration no. PR-AYU (cn 19000434)) with a new name and livery. The airplane, which was formerly called "Azultec", has been renamed "#sennasempre" ("Senna forever") and features the IAS logo on the rear side of the fuselage and the graphics of Senna's F1 helmet at the front, making it appear as though it is wearing the iconic helmet.

Tributes were also made at the Imola circuit to mark the 20th anniversary of Senna's death. On 1 May 2014, thousands of fans from around the world gathered at the Tamburello corner, at the exact scene where Senna suffered his fatal crash 20 years earlier, to hold a minute's silence. Various current and former F1 drivers were in attendance, including: Ferrari drivers Fernando Alonso and Kimi Räikkönen; Ferrari Driver Academy member Jules Bianchi; Senna's close friend and McLaren teammate, Gerhard Berger; and the Italians Jarno Trulli, Ivan Capelli, Pierluigi Martini, Andrea de Cesaris, and Emanuele Pirro. Flowers and other cherishable items were also placed around the statue of Senna, situated directly adjacent to the Tamburello corner.

In May and July 2014, the Republic of San Marino issued 70,008 commemorative EUR 2,50 stamps as well as 8,000 silver proof coins in Eur 5,00 denomination. In December 2014, a French company also produced 520 commemorative coins designed by a Brazilian artist. The American firm Rosland Capital collaborated with the Ayrton Senna Institute to produce a commemorative coin collection in 2017.

In November 2014 British artist Ian Berry unveiled a portrait of Ayrton in São Paulo at the Institut Ayrton Senna to the press and the family of Ayrton Senna. The artist famed for his artwork using only jeans presented the piece, that also included the jeans of the Senna family to great acclaim. The piece traveled around the world for many fans to see and commemorated the 20th anniversary of his passing.

In 2015, when Lewis Hamilton matched Ayrton's three titles, the Senna family gave him an edition of the Ian Berry portrait made out of the family's jeans, Viviane Senna presented it to him at the São Paulo GP.

On 10 June 2017, after qualifying on pole for the Canadian Grand Prix Lewis Hamilton was presented with a Senna helmet that had been worn by Senna during a race. It was given by Senna's family in recognition of Hamilton's 65th pole position, matching Senna's tally.

McLaren unveiled the McLaren Senna, a 789 bhp track-focused sports car named after Senna, on 9 December 2017.

On 1 October 2018 Nike and Corinthians in partnership with the Ayrton Senna Institute unveiled a never-before-seen collection inspired by the Lotus team's colour scheme honouring Ayrton Senna, including the team's new third kit. The collection #LuteAtéSerEterno [fight until you're eternal] is a tribute to the 30th anniversary of the driver's first world title, which he won at Suzuka, in Japan. A half-Austrian, half-Brazilian flag was presented on the top step of the podium by the race winner of the 2019 Spanish Grand Prix in honour of Ratzenberger and Senna.

A DLC for Codemasters' F1 2019 depicting Senna's rivalry with Alain Prost was released in June, complete with digitised depictions of the two drivers along with car liveries inspired by their helmet designs.

On 19 September 2021, a bronze life-size statue of Ayrton Senna was unveiled in Walbrzych (Poland), standing in a street named after him.

There is a sculpture of him in Barcelona by British artist Paul Oz. It was unveiled on 8 May 2019, to mark the 25th anniversary of Senna's death.

Minor planet 6543 Senna is named in his honor.

Helmet design

In his karting days, Senna's helmet consisted of a plain white background with notable features absent. He experimented with several designs to satisfy him, such as a white, yellow, and green helmet, before settling on a design by Sid Mosca that included a yellow background with a green stripe surrounding the upper visor and a light metallic blue stripe surrounding the lower visor (both stripes are delineated in the other stripe's color) that was first seen in 1979; Mosca also painted helmets for Emerson Fittipaldi and Nelson Piquet.

According to Mosca, the blue and green stripes symbolised movement and aggression, while the overall yellow colour symbolised youth; the three colors were also identifiable with the Flag of Brazil. The helmet never had significant changes, apart from sponsorship. One such change was that Senna occasionally altered the stripe from blue to black. The tone of yellow changed a number of times, while usually a rich sunburst yellow, in 1985 and 1986 in some races, he used a fluorescent neon yellow colour. In 1994, the helmet was a lighter, paler yellow to complement the blue and white of the Williams car. He used a number of helmet brands throughout his career. From 1977 to 1989, he used Bell (Star – '77 to '82, XFM-1 – '83 to '89), from 1990 to 1991 Honda's own Rheos brand, 1992 to 1993 he used Shoei (X-4) and for 1994 he returned to using Bell (M3 Kevlar). The helmet worn by Senna in the fatal race was returned to Bell in 2002 and was incinerated while family members watched.

Third-party adaptations

His nephew Bruno wore a modified version of his helmet design (a yellow helmet with a green and blue stripe) during his Formula One career, but the stripes are shaped after an S rather than being straight, under the chin area it has a green stripe, and it has a blue rounded rectangle in the top area. Bruno sported a modified helmet design for the final three races of the 2011 season to honour the 20th anniversary of Ayrton winning his last world championship.

At the 1995 Brazilian Grand Prix, Rubens Barrichello incorporated part of Senna's helmet design into his own. For the 2011 Brazilian Grand Prix, another variant of Senna's helmet was used by Lewis Hamilton and by Barrichello too. Hamilton used the design with permission from Senna's sister Viviane and the helmet was later sold in support of the IAS. At the 2015 Brazilian Grand Prix, Hamilton again varied his helmet design (this time, the rear only given FIA restrictions on design changes in force from 2015) accompanied with a Twitter announcement stating "Just for you, Brazil!! A tribute to the greatest".

Outside of motor racing, Brazilian cyclist Murilo Fischer wore a helmet based on Senna's helmet colour scheme of yellow with green and blue stripes on stage 11 of the 2015 Giro d'Italia, which finished on the Imola circuit.

For the 2020 Emilia Romagna Grand Prix at Imola, Pierre Gasly wore a special helmet with Senna's colours and the Senna Sempre (Senna Forever) badging on top.

Karting record

Karting career summary

Racing record

Career summary

Complete British Formula 3 results
(key) (Races in bold indicate pole position) (Races in italics indicate fastest lap)

Complete Macau Grand Prix results

Complete Formula One results
(key) (Races in bold indicate pole position; races in italics indicate fastest lap)

 Half points awarded as less than 75% of race distance was completed.
 Driver did not finish the Grand Prix, but was classified as he completed over 90% of the race distance.

Complete World Sportscar Championship results
(key) (Races in bold indicate pole position) (Races in italics indicate fastest lap)

Formula One records
Senna holds these Formula One records:

See also 

 List of Formula One Grand Prix wins by Ayrton Senna
 McLaren Senna

References

External links 

  
 A Tribute to Life Network – Home of European fans
 Ayrton Senna Legacy Matters
 
 
 
 Instituto Ayrton Senna
 Formula One's Hall of Fame driver profile
 BBC Sport: Formula 1's Greatest Drivers
 Senna Documentary with Reviews and Discussion
 Imolayrton

 
1960 births
1994 deaths
20th-century Roman Catholics
20th-century Brazilian businesspeople
Accidental deaths in Italy
Brazilian expatriates in Monaco
Brazilian expatriates in Portugal
Brazilian expatriate sportspeople in the United Kingdom
Brazilian Formula One drivers
Brazilian people of Italian descent
Brazilian philanthropists
Brazilian racing drivers
Brazilian Roman Catholics
British Formula Three Championship drivers
Burials in Brazil
Karting World Championship drivers
Filmed deaths in motorsport
Formula Ford drivers
Formula One race winners
Formula One World Drivers' Champions
International Motorsports Hall of Fame inductees
McLaren Formula One drivers
Racing drivers who died while racing
Sport deaths in Italy
Racing drivers from São Paulo
Team Lotus Formula One drivers
Toleman Formula One drivers
Williams Formula One drivers
World Sportscar Championship drivers
Team Joest drivers